Oxybismuthides or bismuthide oxides are chemical compounds formally containing the group BiO, with one bismuth and one oxygen atom. The bismuth and oxygen are not bound together as in bismuthates, instead they make a separate presence bound to the cations (metals), and could be considered as a mixed bismuthide-oxide compound. So a compound with OmBin requires cations to balance a negative charge of 2m+3n. The cations will have charges of +2 or +3. The trications are often rare earth elements or actinides. They are in the category of oxypnictide compounds.

Many of the bismuthide oxides have bismuth in an unusual -2 oxidation state. The ones with Ln2BiO2 have the anti-ThCr2Si2 structure. They include alternating layers of LnO (anti-fluorite-type) and LnBiO. The Eu4Bi2O has an anti-K2NiF4 structure, the same as for Na2Ti2As2O. Some other compounds contain calcium and a rare earth CaRE3BiO4, and Ca2RE8Bi3O10.

Some of these compounds are superconductors at very low temperatures and many are semiconductors at standard conditions.

Examples

References

Bismuth compounds
Bismuthides
Oxides
Mixed anion compounds